Annika Hernroth-Rothstein (born 29 May 1981) is a Swedish journalist and activist. In 2020, she published her first book, Exile - portraits of the Jewish Diaspora. The Algemeiner Journal considered her one of the top 100 people positively influencing Jewish life.

Career 
Hernroth-Rothstein attended Uppsala University and Linnaeus University where she attained a B.A. degree in Media and Communication as well as in Middle Eastern Studies. Between 2013 and 2015, she worked as a political advisor for the Swedish liberal party, Folkpartiet, as part of the conservative political coalition “Alliansen”.

Political activism 
She frequently writes on the issues of antisemitism both in Sweden and abroad. In September 2012, Hernroth-Rothstein organized a pro-Israel rally of almost 1500 people in the center of Stockholm. In 2013 she drew attention to alleged antisemitism in Sweden and to protest a series of measures in Sweden banning kosher slaughter, ritual circumcision, and possibly even the importation of kosher meat. In August 2013, Hernroth-Rothstein applied for political asylum in her own country of Sweden on the basis of religious persecution. 

Her 2017 interview with Tucker Carlson was quoted by Donald Trump.

Iran 
In 2016, she visited Iran during parliamentary elections. She visited several synagogues in Tehran and Hamedan and reported on the condition of Iranian Jews. She reported that Iranian authorities were aware of her Israeli ties and her political Zionist activities on the visa application but still granted her a visa. During interview with Israel Hayom, she reported that she was invited to the office of Supreme leader of Iran, Ayatollah Khamenei, during the elections. She further reported that she was greeted personally by the President Hassan Rouhani several times. She reported her trip in an article entitled "Totalitarian terror in Iran" in The Tower Magazine.

Venezuela 
In early 2019, she went to Venezuela, and reported that she was threatened, ransacked and beaten by paramilitary groups loyal to President Nicolás Maduro known as colectivos on 23 February 2019. She interviewed self-declared interim president Juan Guaido. Rothstein returned to Venezuela on 18 April 2019, but she was briefly detained at the airport by the Venezuelan National Guard (GNB) and was subsequently deported.

Awards and honors 
The Algemeiner Journal selected Hernroth-Rothstein in their 2020 list of 100 people positively influencing Jewish life.

Publications 
In 2020, Hernroth-Rothstein published Exile: Portraits of the Jewish Diaspora.

See also 
 Larry Cohler-Esses
 Orly Azoulay

References 

1981 births
Living people
Linnaeus University alumni
Swedish activists
Swedish journalists
Swedish women writers
Uppsala University alumni
Place of birth missing (living people)